The Tuloy Football Club is a professional football club based in Alabang, Muntinlupa, Philippines. Their women's side competed at the PFF Women's League, the top flight women's football league in the Philippines, debuting in the second season in 2018. The men's side announced participation for the 2023 Copa Paulino Alcantara. They are affiliated with the Tuloy Foundation.

History (women's team)
The Tuloy Football Club is a team based in Alabang, Muntinlupa, with majority of players coming from the Tuloy Foundation, a street children village.
Tuloy, along with De La Salle Zobel, were the two teams which debuted at the 2018 PFF Women's League season. Their first PFF Women's League match was on August 25, 2018 where they lost 0–1 to De La Salle. They garnered their first win in the league in their following match by outbesting Ateneo 2–1 on September 1, 2018. Tuloy has played Ateneo before in friendly matches, but their win in the PFF Women's League was the first time they officially prevailed over the collegiate side. They placed fourth in their inaugural season and won the Fair Play award. Tuloy player Isabella Bandoja scored the most goals of the season (22) and was awarded the Golden Boot.

References

Women's football clubs in the Philippines
PFF Women's League clubs